Hystrisyphona is a genus of parasitic flies in the family Tachinidae.

Species
Hystrisyphona nigra Bigot, 1859

References

Dexiinae
Diptera of North America
Tachinidae genera
Monotypic Brachycera genera
Taxa named by Jacques-Marie-Frangile Bigot